Whispers of Betrayal is a 2000 novel by Michael Dobbs that tells the third story in the Tom Goodfellowe series. It details a group of military officers who try to topple the Prime Minister.

Character list 
 Tom Goodfellowe MP - Backbench MP, protagonist, offered a senior Cabinet job by Vertue at the end of the novel.
 Colonel Peter Amadeus - Army Officer who wants to bring down the Prime Minister. 
 Jonathan Bendall MP - UK Prime Minister, resigns at the end of the book, served for 3 and a half years. Based on Tony Blair
 George Vertue MP - Chancellor of the Exchequer, becomes Prime Minister after Bendall's resignation, based on Gordon Brown
 Noel O. Hope MP - Was the Home Secretary, forced to resign by Bendall, initials were N.O Hope, based on Jack Straw
 Gerald Earwick MP - Defence Secretary, succeeds Hope as Home Secretary, served for around a month before being forced to resign over a gay affair leaked by the plotters. Based on David Blunkett 
 Colonel Abel Gittings OBE - Former Signals Officer, senior Ministry of Defence official. Was Mary's commanding officer
 Mary - A soldier in the Signals regiment who joins Amadeus in his plot.
 Scully - A soldier who is divorced who joins Amadeus as well, dies destroying Battersea power station
 McKenzie - Another plotter
 Payne - Another plotter
 Lord "Frankie" - Lord Chancellor, personal friend of Bendall, based on Charles Falconer.
 Eddie Rankin MP - Chief Whip, knows Goodfellowe personally. Based on Nick Brown
 Dame Patricia - senior civil servant, Cabinet Secretary

References 

2000 British novels
Novels by Michael Dobbs
British political novels
HarperCollins books